The Semington Locks are situated at Semington, Wiltshire on the Kennet and Avon Canal, England.

They have a combined rise/fall of 16 feet 1 inch (4.9 m).

The two locks at Semington are known as Buckley's (No.15) and Barrett's (No.16).

Adjacent to the locks is the point at which the former Wilts and Berks Canal joined the Kennet and Avon.

Close by, the Grade II listed Semington Aqueduct carries the canal over the Semington Brook.  East of the locks, the canal crosses the New Semington Aqueduct, built in 2004 to bridge the newly constructed Semington village bypass (A350 road).

See also

Locks on the Kennet and Avon Canal
New Semington Aqueduct
Semington Aqueduct

References

External links

 West Wilts Branch of The Kennet and Avon Canal Trust

Locks on the Kennet and Avon Canal
Canals in Wiltshire